The Content Label is a Los Angeles based independent record label and collective. It was formed in 2004 by music producer Dday One.

Roster
2Tall/Om Unit
Blak King
Block Barley
Dday One
Dextah
Double K (People Under the Stairs)
Enigmatical
Gone Beyond
Inner Science 
King Knut
Marques Lafelt
Mumbles
Olde Soul
Glen Porter
Son of a Bricklayer
Antti Szurawitizki

Cover artists 
ETMCA 
Mikko Kempas
Oliver Cartwright
Shane "Dwarf Baby" Ingersoll
Udeze Ukwuoma

Discography

 CNT-1001 Dday One - Loop Extensions (2005)
 CNT-1002 Dday One / Dextah - Sense of Balance/Untitled #541 (2006)
 CNT-1003 Various - Signal Path (2007)
 CNT-1004 Dday One - Heavy Migration (2008)
 CNT-1005 2Tall - The Softer Diagram (2008)
 CNT-1006 Olde Soul | Double K - Taking Me Places/Face to Face (2008)
 CNT-1007 King Knut - Grazing On Empty Remixes (2009)
 CNT-1008 Dday One - Journal - (2009)
 CNT-1009 Dday One | Glen Porter - Wavelengths (2010)
 CNT-1010 Son Of A Bricklayer - The Day the Sky Fell In (2011)
 CNT-1011 Various - Content (L)abel Sampler 1 (2011)
 CNT-1012 Various - Content (L)abel Sampler 2 (2011)
 CNT-1014 Dday One - Loop Extensions | Deluxe (2011)
 CNT-1015 Dday One - Mood Algorithms (2011)
 CNT-1017 Gone Beyond | Mumbles -A Duet for Space and Time (2012)

See also
 List of record labels

References

External links
 Content (L)abel Homepage

American independent record labels
Record labels established in 2004
Hip hop record labels